The Soho Society is a community association for the London district of Soho.

It was founded in 1970 by local residents such as Bryan Burroughs and had over 1000 members.  It campaigned against the domination of the area by sex shops and was successful in gaining the status of conservation area for the district.  In 1978, it supported independent candidates for Westminster City Council to challenge the Conservative party's control of the council, as they were thought to be encouraging and exploiting the sex industry. 

The society is a registered charity and a recognised amenity society for the City of Westminster. In 1976, it established the Soho Housing Association to manage 400 flats for residents of the area.

References

External links

Community organizations
Neighborhood associations
Soho, London
Organizations established in 1970